Zijingshan is a metro station of Zhengzhou Metro.

The station is an interchange station between Line 1 and Line 2. It became the first interchange station in Zhengzhou Metro system, with the opening of Line 2 on 19 August 2016.

Station layout

The station has 4 levels underground. The concourse is on the B2 level. The platforms for Line 1 and Line 2 are both island platforms. The B3 level is for the platforms of Line 1 and the B4 level is for the platforms of Line 2.

A staircase connecting the platforms on B3 and B4 levels is for passengers transferring from Line 2 to Line 1. Passengers transferring from Line 1 to Line 2 have to go up to the concourse first.

Exits

Surrounding area

Zijingshan Park (紫荆山公园)
Zijingshan Department Store (紫荆山百货大楼)
People's Square (人民广场)
Henan Hotel (河南饭店)
Yellow River Conservancy Commission (黄河水利委员会)
CPC Henan Provincial Committee (中共河南省委)

References

Stations of Zhengzhou Metro
Line 1, Zhengzhou Metro
Line 2, Zhengzhou Metro
Railway stations in China opened in 2013